Rauman Työväen Urheilijat (abbreviated RTU) is a sports club from Rauma in Finland.  The club was formed in 1929. They participate in orienteering, floorball and athletics.

Background
RTU was founded in 1929 when local social democratic workers association formed the club. In 1952 club reached its highest membership count to date with 1317 members. RTU is the only club from Rauma to play top tier football in Finland, they were also first club from Satakunta to play in premier division.

Season to season in football

External links

References 

Sports clubs in Finland
Football clubs in Finland
Rauma, Finland